Reachin' All Around is the twelfth album by Thelma Houston released in 1982. The album consists of previously unreleased material recorded while at Motown Records. While the album did not become a major seller, it is well liked by her fans. This album was released on CD in 2018 by Soulmusic Records, in a compilation that also includes The Devil in Me, Ready to Roll and Ride to the Rainbow.

The arrangers include Van McCoy, Greg Wright, James Anthony Carmichael, Paul Riser, Gene Page, Greg Poree. Arthur G. Wright, Michael Omartian and John Myles.

Track listing
 "You Were Never My Friend" (Charles Kipps, Van McCoy)
 "Reachin' All Around My Love" (Lawrence Brown, Terri McFaddin)
 "I Can't Go Home Again" (Ronald Miller)
 "Lies" (Lawrence Brown, Terri McFaddin)
 "Don't Wonder Why" (Leonard Caston)
 "I Never Took No For an Answer" (Mitchell Botler, Norma Helms) 
 "Rhythm of Love" (Kathy Wakefield, Ken Hirsch)
 "(I've Given You) The Best Years of My Life" (Dino Fekaris, Jack Alan Goga, Nick Zesses)
 "A Little Bit a Heaven and a Little Bit a Hell" (Deirdre Meehan, Michael Masser)
 Medley:"Stormy Weather"/"I Can't Stand The Rain" (Harold Arlen, Ted Koehler/Ann Peebles, Bernard Miller, Don Bryant)

1982 albums
Thelma Houston albums
albums arranged by Gene Page
albums arranged by Paul Riser
Albums produced by Hal Davis
Albums produced by Michael Masser
Motown albums